E801 may refer to:
 European route E801
 EV-E801 series